Petra Mandula and Patricia Wartusch were the defending champions, but Mandula did not compete this year. Wartusch teamed up with Barbara Schett and lost in quarterfinals to Kira Nagy and Adriana Serra Zanetti.

Emmanuelle Gagliardi and Janette Husárová won the title by defeating Olga Blahotová and Gabriela Navrátilová 6–3, 6–2 in the final. It was the 1st title for Gagliardi and the 17th title for Husárová in their respective doubles careers.

Seeds

Draw

Draw

References
 Main and Qualifying Draws

2004 Women's Doubles
Doubles
Estoril Open